Deh-e Ahmad or Deh Ahmad may refer to:
 Deh-e Ahmad, Kohgiluyeh and Boyer-Ahmad
 Deh-e Ahmad, Markazi
 Deh-e Ahmad, Sistan and Baluchestan